Aspicilia (sunken disk lichen) is a genus of mostly crustose areolate lichens that grow on rock. Most members have black apothecia discs that are slightly immersed in the areolas, hence the common name.

Most of the species of this genus grow on calcareous and acidic rocks and most of the taxa prefer temperate and arctic habitats.

Some members of the genus Aspicilia are pioneer species on granite and other hard rock, after which members of other lichen species may grow on them, such as members of Acarospora.

Description
Members of this genus are weakly cracked to distinctly areolate, with a scattered to whole thalli. Some of the species of this genus are disc-shaped with plicate lobes at the circumference; these lobes may appear chalky white, grayish, greenish or brownish. Some possess vegetative means of propagation such as isidia (column-like structures of fungal and algal cells normally found on the top-side or outer cortex of the lichen) and soredia (structures that produce soralia, granule-like masses of intertwined fungal and algal cells occurring on top of the cortex and on the margins).

They have characteristic ascomata which are mostly immersed but occasionally emergent. They have 4 to 8 spored asci that are cylindrical to club-shaped. Their ascospores are typically ellipsoid to globose in shape, colorless and thin-walled. They often contain β-orcinol depsidones (secondary metabolites of lichens) such as norstictic acid and stictic acids; others have fatty acids or triterpenes. In genus Aspicilia dramatic changes in growth forms are very common, and some taxa may display extreme transitions within the same population or even changes within the same thallus.

Classification
Previously placed in the family Hymeneliaceae, phylogenetic analyses indicate that the genus is better placed in the family Megasporaceae.

Species
, Species Fungorum accepts 70 species of Aspicilia.

Aspicilia abbasiana 
Aspicilia albosparsa 
Aspicilia angelica 
Aspicilia aquatica 
Aspicilia arizonica 
Aspicilia armeniaca 
Aspicilia aurantiaca 
Aspicilia auricularis 
Aspicilia berntii 
Aspicilia bicensis 
Aspicilia blastidiata 
Aspicilia boykinii 
Aspicilia brucei 
Aspicilia calcitrapa 
Aspicilia californica 
Aspicilia candida 
Aspicilia cinerea 
Aspicilia confusa 
Aspicilia corallophora 
Aspicilia cuprea 
Aspicilia cyanescens 
Aspicilia desertorum 
Aspicilia dubertretii 
Aspicilia endochlora 
Aspicilia epiglypta 
Aspicilia euphratica 
Aspicilia expansa 
Aspicilia fluviatilis 
Aspicilia fruticulosofoliacea 
Aspicilia fumosa 
Aspicilia granulosa 
Aspicilia grisea 
Aspicilia guadalupensis 
Aspicilia humida  – South Korea
Aspicilia knudsenii 
Aspicilia laevata 
Aspicilia major  – Falkland Islands
Aspicilia nashii 
Aspicilia niesenensis 
Aspicilia ochromelaena 
Aspicilia olivaceobrunnea 
Aspicilia olivaceopallida 
Aspicilia pacifica 
Aspicilia peltastictoides 
Aspicilia persica 
Aspicilia phaea 
Aspicilia prestensis 
Aspicilia pseudoabbasiana 
Aspicilia pseudovulcanica 
Aspicilia punctiformis 
Aspicilia reagens 
Aspicilia santamonicae 
Aspicilia serpentinicola 
Aspicilia sipeana 
Aspicilia stalagmitica 
Aspicilia straussii 
Aspicilia subcaesia 
Aspicilia subdepressa 
Aspicilia subepiglypta 
Aspicilia subfarinosa 
Aspicilia subgeographica 
Aspicilia subgoettweigensis 
Aspicilia submamillata 
Aspicilia substerilis 
Aspicilia substictica 
Aspicilia taurica 
Aspicilia tuberculosa 
Aspicilia verrucigera

Gallery

References

Pertusariales
Lichen genera
Pertusariales genera
Taxa named by Abramo Bartolommeo Massalongo
Taxa described in 1852